Pierre Louis François Lévêque de Vilmorin (1816–March 22, 1860), usually referred to as Louis de Vilmorin, the grandson of Philippe André de Vilmorin, and a member of the family firm of Vilmorin-Andrieux, devoted his life to biology and chemistry, with a focus on the breeding and cultivation of plants. 

Louis de Vilmorin developed a theory of heredity in plants and recognized that it was possible to select certain characteristics of a plant and develop new varieties displaying the chosen characteristics. In 1856, de Vilmorin published his "Note on the Creation of a New Race of Beetroot and Considerations on Heredity in Plants," establishing the theoretical groundwork for the modern seed-breeding industry.

Writings
 "Note on the Creation of a New Race of Beetroot and Considerations on Heredity in Plants," - Louis de Vilmorin

See also 
 Philippe André de Vilmorin (1776–1862)
 Joseph-Marie-Philippe Lévêque de Vilmorin (1872–1917)
 Louise Leveque de Vilmorin (1902–1969)

References 

1816 births
1860 deaths
19th-century French botanists